Ambrose O'Connell (July 9, 1881 – October 12, 1962) was an associate judge of the United States Court of Customs and Patent Appeals.

Education and career

Born on July 9, 1881, near Ottumwa, Iowa, O'Connell received a Bachelor of Philosophy degree in 1907 from the University of Notre Dame and a Bachelor of Laws in 1910 from Columbia Law School. He was an attorney for the Guarantee Trust Corporation in New York City, New York from 1928 to 1932. He was an assistant trust officer and office manager for the Democratic National Committee from 1932 to 1933. He was with the United States Post Office Department from 1933 to 1943, as a special assistant and executive assistant to United States Postmaster General James Farley from 1933 to 1939, as second assistant postmaster general from 1939 to 1940 and as first assistant postmaster general from 1940 to 1943. He was the Executive Vice-Chairman of the Democratic National Committee from 1943 to 1944.

Federal judicial service

O'Connell was nominated by President Franklin D. Roosevelt on May 19, 1944, to an Associate Judge seat on the United States Court of Customs and Patent Appeals vacated by Associate Judge Irvine Lenroot. He was confirmed by the United States Senate on June 6, 1944, and received his commission on June 10, 1944. He assumed senior status on April 10, 1962. His service terminated on October 12, 1962, due to his death in San Mateo, California.

References

Sources
 

1881 births
1962 deaths
Columbia Law School alumni
Judges of the United States Court of Customs and Patent Appeals
New York (state) Democrats
New York (state) lawyers
United States Article I federal judges appointed by Franklin D. Roosevelt
20th-century American judges
United States Postal Service people
University of Notre Dame alumni
Democratic National Committee people